Rhodambulyx is a genus of moths in the family Sphingidae first described by Rudolf Mell in 1939.

Species
Rhodambulyx davidi Mell, 1939
Rhodambulyx hainanensis Brechlin, 2001
Rhodambulyx schnitzleri Cadiou, 1990

References

Smerinthini
Moth genera